Ganesh Naik (born 15 September 1950) is an Indian politician. He is the Bhartiya Janta Party member of the Maharashtra Legislative Assembly who represented Belapur in the past, and was the Thane Guardian Minister in the state government. He was the minister of Labour, excise and environment in the previous government.

Political career
Ganesh Naik began his career as an MLA in 1990 with Shiv sena but later switched to the Nationalist Congress party in 1999. He belongs to the locally powerful agri community.

Vidhan Sabha election 2014
In the Maharashtra state assembly polls, results for which were announced on 19 October 2014, Naik lost to the BJP candidate by around 1,500 votes. Manda Vijay Mhatre, the winning candidate had left NCP just before the elections, opposing the family rule of the Naik clan in Navi Mumbai. Naik's son, Sandeep Naik, however, was re-elected to the Airoli seat by margin of over 7,000 votes. Earlier in May parliamentary elections, his other son, Dr Sanjeev Naik, had lost his seat to the Shiv Sena by a huge margin.

References

Living people
Marathi politicians
People from Thane district
Nationalist Congress Party politicians from Maharashtra
1950 births
State cabinet ministers of Maharashtra
Maharashtra MLAs 2009–2014
Maharashtra MLAs 1995–1999
Shiv Sena politicians
Politics of Thane district
Bharatiya Janata Party politicians from Maharashtra